The 1992 SEC Championship Game was played on December 5, 1992, at Legion Field in Birmingham, Alabama.  The Southeastern Conference (SEC) was the first conference in NCAA Division I college football to host a post-season conference championship game, and the 1992 game was the first time the SEC Championship Game was held. The inaugural match-up determined the 1992 SEC football champion.  The Alabama Crimson Tide of the University of Alabama, winners of the SEC Western Division, defeated the Florida Gators of the University of Florida, who won the SEC Eastern Division, by a score of 28-21.

Following the game, undefeated Alabama advanced to the Sugar Bowl, where the Crimson Tide defeated the Miami Hurricanes to win the Crimson Tide's 12th national championship.

Game summary
The Florida Gators scored first, on a five-yard touchdown reception by Errict Rhett to take a 7–0 lead in the first quarter.  The Crimson Tide responded by scoring the next 21 points.  The Tide's first points came later in the first quarter on a Derrick Lassic 3-yard touchdown run to tie the game at 7–7.  In the second quarter, Curtis Brown would score on a 30-yard touchdown reception from Jay Barker to take a 14–7 lead at the half.

Alabama would further extend their lead to 21–7 in the third on a 15-yard Derrick Lassic touchdown run. Down by 14, the Gators would respond with a pair of touchdowns, tying the game at 21 midway through the fourth quarter. Willie Jackson would score first on a 4-yard touchdown reception on a pass from Shane Matthews late in the third, and Errict Rhett would knot the game at 21 with just over eight minutes remaining in the contest. With momentum in the favor of the Gators, with 3:16 remaining in the game, Antonio Langham would return a Matthews interception 27-yards for a touchdown in providing the final 28–21 margin.

See also
 Alabama–Florida football rivalry

References

External links
Recap of the 1992 SEC Championship game at SECSports.com

Championship
1992
1992
1992
December 1992 sports events in the United States
1992 in sports in Alabama